Tvin Carole Moumjoghlian (born July 21, 1989]) is a Lebanese table tennis player playing for Homenetmen Beirut. With her win at the West Asia Women's Qualification Tournament, she qualified for the London 2012 Olympic Games.

Born in Beirut, she began playing table tennis at age 9, following into her father's footsteps, Raffi Moumjoghlian, who is a former Lebanese table tennis champion. She reached the second round at the 2010 Asian Games in Guangzhou, China (losing to Olympic medalist Park Mi-Young) and headed the Lebanese team to the women's bronze medal at the 2011 Pan Arab Games.

Moumjoghlian holds a bachelor's degree in Economics from the American University of Beirut.

References

External links
Lebanon's Olympic table tennis family - video from The Guardian

1989 births
Living people
Lebanese female table tennis players
Sportspeople from Beirut
Table tennis players at the 2012 Summer Olympics
Olympic table tennis players of Lebanon
Lebanese people of Armenian descent
Table tennis players at the 2010 Asian Games
Asian Games competitors for Lebanon